BTC is the primary telecommunications provider for the Bahamas, headquartered in Nassau, New Providence. It is partly government owned and offers telephone, internet and wireless services.

BTC is an initialism for the Bahamas Telecommunications Company and offers telephone, internet and wireless services. In New Providence and Grand Bahama, it operates a GSM based EDGE, HSPA, HSPA+ and LTE network. Dual-class shares are 49% economic shares/49% voting shares of BTC are owned by the Government of the Bahamas, with 49% economic shares/51% voting shares owned by Cable & Wireless Communications and 2% economic shares in a national trust.

History

1892- Late 1990s 
In 1892, a telegraph cable was laid between Jupiter, Florida and the western district of New Providence, coming ashore in Goodman’s Bay, Bahamas. The area then became known as "Cable Beach." On October 5, 1906, the first telephone system was introduced with 150 subscribers in Nassau.

Bimini got wireless telegraphy in 1920 and Grand Bahama opened its first Telegraph Station in West End in 1925. On December 16, 1933, the first telephone service to the United States from the Bahamas was introduced.

After World War II, the Telecommunications Department, of The Bahamas  began to make steady progress in its development. Frequency shifters, the first in the Caribbean, were installed in 1946. An automatic time of day announcer was installed in Nassau in 1951, the very first outside of the continental US. Nine years later, in 1960, a Forward Tropospheric Scatter was installed between Delaporte and Florida City, the second of its kind in this hemisphere, the first being in Cuba.

In 1966, the Government of The Bahamas, by an Act of Parliament, incorporated the Telecommunications Department as the Bahamas Telecommunications Corporation, a quasi-governmental corporation, known as Batelco. In 1967, the formerly expatriate-run Batelco got its first all-Bahamian Executive team, under the direction of R.E. Knowles, the first Bahamian General Manager.
 
In 1971, direct distance dialing was introduced for Batelco operators and in 1972, under new General Manager Aubrey E. Curling, a $7 million submarine cable was installed from West Palm Beach to Eight Mile Rock through a joint venture agreement between AT & T and Batelco.
 
Robert Bartlett took the reins of the Corporation on October 15, 1979, when he became General Manager. Under Mr. Bartlett’s administration, Batelco moved from its rented location in the Chase Building on Thompson Boulevard to its own offices on John F. Kennedy Drive, where the company’s headquarters is currently located.  
 
In 1986 the Corporation joined the Caribbean Association of National Telecommunications Organizations (CANTO) and hosted its annual meeting and trade show, as well as acquiring the assets of The Grand Bahama Telephone Company. It was also in the late eighties that Cellular Telephone Service was inaugurated in The Bahamas.
 
In 1990, Robert Bartlett retired and Barrett Russell succeeded him as General Manager. In February 1992, fibre optics became a part of the Batelco system, enabling  system upgrades throughout the archipelago, including Inagua where service was introduced in March of that year.
 
Sir Albert Miller took over as Executive Chairman of Batelco in 1995. The following year, on April 10, 1996, an agreement was signed for the engineering and installation of the Bahamas II Submarine Cable and, on August 26, Batelco entered the internet market with the introduction of Batelnet.
 
The 1990s ended with the introduction of CLASS to residential customers, bringing them caller id, automatic recall and a number of other features. The end of the millennium also saw significant upgrades to its fiber optic system, including a 26 million dollar cable between Vero Beach, Florida and Eight Mile Rock owned by a consortium with Batelco and AT&T as the Terminal parties.

From BATELCO to BTC 
The new millennium also marked a change from the name Batelco. On September 4, 2002, the company transitioned to the initialism BTC.

In the mid-2000s, the GSM (Global System for Mobile) telephone system was introduced and replaced TDMA (Time Division Multiple Access ).
 
During this time, the submarine BDSNI cable was introduced, connecting 14 islands of The Bahamas.  
 
In 2006, the BHi or Bahamas Haiti International marked the first time BTC partnered with another nation. Using the BDSNI cable, BTC links Port-au-Prince, Haiti with Matthew Town, Inagua peas the neighbouring nation with Vibe, I-Connect, GSM, WiFi and other products and services .
 
In 2007 BTC partnered with Cisco Networks to build a new Multiprotocol Label Switching (MPLS) backbone. This new network allowed BTC to provide new internet-protocol (IP) services to their customers.
 
In late 2007, in conjunction with the Ministry of Health, BTC tested a pilot program that allowed medical experts in New Providence to read the vital signs of a patient located at a Ministry of Health clinic in Coopers Town, Abaco.

During 2007 the Six Sigma program was created to reduce the response time to both fault resolution and the installation of services. The Universal Customer Service Representative (CSR), was designed to allow a CSR to work across different technologies, products and services, serving as a “one-stop shop” for BTC customers.
 
In 2008, a new online directory, bahamasypages. com was also introduced.

Privatization
On April 6, 2011, the Government of The Bahamas and Cable & Wireless Communications signed a document, privatizing The Bahamas Telecommunications Company - BTC  and  transferred 51% of the public corporation to the London-based company for a purchase price of $210 million. New payment methods including online minute-loading were introduced. A single nlokkdenv shxzcuvs launched. The elimination of long distance charges between islands for calls originating from cell phones was introduced and a half million dollar expansion transformed what had been an administrative complex into the largest CWC store in the Caribbean. BTC also began a multimillion-dollar network overhaul to shift its data traffic from 2.5G speed to 4G, enabling the introduction of a host of high-speed phones and devices on the market. In 2014, after a change in government, a 2% share of the company - and controlling interest in BTC - was transferred from CWC back to Government.

Services

Broadband and Data  
 DSL Speed Test 
 Wi-Fi 
 I-Connect (DSL) 
 My I-connect (email) 
 Vibe Unite 
 Metro Ethernet 
 Talk It Up Calling Card 
 EZTop-Up

Wireless 

 Prepaid
 PostPaid
 Roaming
 Handsets
 Mobile to Mobile TopUp
 iText (international texting)
 MMS

Radio frequency summary

Voice 

 C.L.A.S.S.
 Telephone Service
 HomePhone Plus

Enterprise Services 

 Key Systems and PBX
 Corporate Internet
 Leased Lines & Data Circuits
 Business Lines
 Satellite Broadcast Services
 International Toll Free

Retail locations 
There are currently 40 BTC retail stores throughout the entire Bahamas.  
On October 13, 2012, the first BTC franchise location was opened on the island of Grand Bahama in the Britannia Plaza, on Polaris Drive.

References

External links 
 
 Parent company

Telecommunications companies of the Bahamas
Mobile phone companies of the Caribbean